The Nanticoke Generating Station was a coal-fired power station in Nanticoke, Ontario in operation from 1972 to 2013. It was the largest coal power station in North America and, at full capacity, it could provide 3,964 MW of power into the southern Ontario power grid from its base in Nanticoke, Ontario, Canada, and provided as much as 15% of Ontario's electricity.

It was decommissioned in 2013 as part of the Government of Ontario's commitment to eliminate coal power. A 44 MW photovoltaic power station, the Nanticoke Solar Facility, was built on the site and entered service in 2019.

Prior to the commencement of decommissioning, Nanticoke was one of Canada's top ten single sources of greenhouse gases.

History
The Nanticoke Generating Station was built on the site of the "Battle of Nanticoke", where in 1813 the Norfolk volunteer militia routed a band of American marauders who had been pillaging area farms and terrorizing the country, an exploit that inspired the British military forces and the people of Upper Canada during the War of 1812.  The site was designated a National Historic Site of Canada in 1924.

Ontario Hydro revealed plans to build a 4,000 MW fossil-fuel generating station near Long Point, Ontario in 1967. Its current site was selected in Nanticoke, Ontario, because of the nearby harbour, the proximity of United States coal supplies, and proximity to much of Ontario's population. The construction of the plant cost CAN$800 million and operations started in 1972. Eight pulverized coal-fired steam generators were built in phases between 1973 and 1978.

By 1981, the plant was consuming 35,000 tonnes of coal per day. Over the years, another $900 million has been invested in making the plant more energy efficient, robust, and improving its emissions.

Plant operations

Power generation and distribution
At full capacity (4000 MW) with all eight generating units functioning, the station's annual electricity production had been as high as 24 billion kilowatt-hours (kWh), enough electricity to run nearly 2.5 million households.  Although the plant houses eight generating units, four of those units have since been retired.  (Two were retired in 2010, and two were retired in 2011.)  The remaining four units are not in operation.

Previously, power generation at this plant was on a stand-by basis, only operating during peak levels of energy consumption, or when other generating facilities are unavailable. At other times the plant would remain idle.  When demand for electricity was high, the remaining four active generating units were put into service, with the maximum potential to produce approximately 5% of Ontario's total generating capacity. (1880 MW out of the 34,079 MW of existing power generation in the province as of January 2012.)  The plant is connected to the power grid by numerous 230,000- and 500,000-volt transmission lines.

Cooling water for the plant was drawn from Lake Erie using two pipes that are 6.5 m in diameter, stretch 550 m offshore, and sit 10 m below the surface. The plant had two multi-flue smokestacks which were both 198 m (650 ft) tall.  A dock on the shore of the site allows ships to deliver coal to an on-site stock pile, which can hold up to 4.5 megatonnes.

At its peak, Nanticoke employed approximately 634 staff from the Haldimand—Norfolk area.

Emissions
The Nanticoke station used to be one of Canada's largest greenhouse gas emitters and polluters. In 2001, it was the largest single source of greenhouse gases according to Environment Canada. Due to major reductions in output since 2009, it was eventually surpassed by facilities in Alberta.

Decommissioning
The Government of Ontario had originally targeted to phase out all of its coal plants by 2009, but abandoned this target in 2006 to the ire of organizations representing nurses and physicians, community groups and environment groups. The province could not replace Nanticoke's energy output by the deadline, despite Units 3 and 4 at Bruce "A" being brought back online between 2003 and 2004. The province was examining replacing this output using nuclear power by refurbishing its existing fleet, and building two additional reactors at the Darlington Nuclear Generating Station. Bruce Power, Canada's only private nuclear power company, also proposed building two reactors on former Stelco lands in Nanticoke. However, this was met with immediate opposition and dismissal from the government. "It's a speculative move on the part of a private company...It doesn't enjoy the support, encouragement [or] approval...of the Government of Ontario," stated George Smitherman, Minister of Energy and Infrastructure. Bruce Power did however move ahead with the refurbishment of "A" Units 1 and 2 in 2005 and Ontario Power Generation commenced refurbishment of Darlington in 2016.

Two units at Nanticoke were shut down in fall 2010. Another two were shut down in 2011. The final four were shut down on December 31, 2013. This was made possible, in part, by the reactivation of Units 1 and 2 at Bruce Nuclear Generating Station the previous year. In July 2015, Ontario Power Generation announced it will no longer "preserve and staff Nanticoke", and the expectation is that the plant will be permanently decommissioned. Its two smokestacks were imploded using controlled demolition on February 28, 2018. The last sections were demolished on August 22, 2019.

See also 

 List of power stations in Canada
 Science and technology in Canada

Notes

References
 Wiancko, P. M. (1981). Environmental Design and Operation of Nanticoke Thermal Generating Station. Journal of Great Lakes Research, 7(2):96-104

Ontario Hydro
Ontario Power Generation
Coal-fired power stations in Ontario
Buildings and structures in Haldimand County
Energy infrastructure completed in 1973
1973 establishments in Ontario
2013 disestablishments in Ontario
Demolished buildings and structures in Ontario
Former coal-fired power stations in Canada